Bluewater Beach is a beachside town within the locality of Bluewater in the City of Townsville, Queensland, Australia.

History 
Originally part of Jalloonda, the town was named on 17 March 1984.

References

External links 
 

Towns in Queensland
City of Townsville